The swimming events of the 1971 Mediterranean Games were held in İzmir, Turkey.

Medalists

Men's events

Women's events

Medal table

References
International Mediterranean Games Committee

Mediterranean Games
Sports at the 1971 Mediterranean Games
1971